Hell's Mouth (Cornish: Ganow Yfarn) is situated northeast of Gwithian on the South West Coast Path in the county of Cornwall, England, UK. The land is owned by the National Trust. It is part of a group of cliff faces in the area, with a café not far from the edge.

In 2011 a jogger on the Cornish Coastal Path noticed cracks in the rock, which is made up of mudstones and sandstones of the Porthtowan Formation and slates/siltstones of the Mylor Slate Formation from the Devonian. The route of the path was diverted as the cracks enlarged. Unusually the rockfall was captured on video.

References

Cornish coast
Tourist attractions in Cornwall